The FIS Snowboarding World Championships 2001 took place between January 22 and January 28 in Madonna di Campiglio, Italy.

Results

Men's Results

Snowboard Cross
The Snowboard Cross finals took place on January 28.

Giant Slalom
The Giant Slalom finals took place on January 22.

Parallel Giant Slalom
Parallel Giant Slalom finals took place on January 24.

Parallel Slalom
The Parallel Slalom finals took place on January 26.

Halfpipe
The finals took place on January 27.

Women's Events

Snowboard Cross
The Snowboard Cross finals took place on January 19.

Giant Slalom
The Snowboard Cross finals took place on January 23.

Parallel Giant Slalom
Parallel Giant Slalom finals took place on January 25.

Parallel Slalom
The Parallel Slalom finals took place on January 26.

Halfpipe
The finals took place on January 27.

Medal table

References

2001
2001 in Italian sport
History of Trentino
Sport in Trentino
2001 in snowboarding